Joseph ben Solomon of Carcassonne was a French Jewish liturgical poet. 

He wrote a  beginning Odekha ki anafta for the first Sabbath of Ḥanukkah. Joseph took material for this yotzer from the Scroll of Antiochus, the Book of Judith, the First Book of Maccabees and the Second Book of Maccabees, working it over in a payyetanic style. It is composed of verses of three lines each arranged in alphabetical order. The poem is mentioned by Rashi in his commentary on Ezekiel xxi. 18. It became an integral part of the Ashkenazi and Italian rites in the Middle Ages.

References

External links
 Translation of Odekha ki anafta at the Open Siddur Project

11th-century French Jews
11th-century French poets
Jewish French writers
Hebrew-language poets
Medieval Jewish poets
People from Carcassonne
Provençal Jews